Sullu Sullu (Aymara sullu miscarried (fetus), Quechua sullu miscarriage; unborn fetus; key for doors or boxes, the reduplication indicates that there is a group or a complex of something, also spelled Sullo Sullo) is a mountain in the Wansu mountain range in the Andes of Peru, about  high. It is situated in the Cusco Region, Chumbivilcas Province, Santo Tomás District. Sullu Sullu lies south of Sara Sara and northeast of Ikma.

References

Mountains of Cusco Region